Evald Voldemar Gering (24 May 1918 – 6 September 2007) was a Canadian sports shooter. He competed in the 300 metre rifle, three positions and 50 metre rifle, three positions events at the 1960 Summer Olympics.

References

1918 births
2007 deaths
People from Paldiski
Canadian male sport shooters
Olympic shooters of Canada
Shooters at the 1960 Summer Olympics
Estonian emigrants to Canada
Pan American Games medalists in shooting
Pan American Games bronze medalists for Canada
Shooters at the 1959 Pan American Games
20th-century Canadian people